All of the Above is the first studio album and overall eighth album by Hillsong United and the first of a three-part global project. The album includes a DVD containing three live worship tracks recorded at the 2006 Encounterfest youth conference, a sermon from Phil Dooley and a bonus features section. It debuted at No. 6 on the ARIA Albums Chart on 26 March 2007.

It has also reached number 1 on the Billboard's Top Christian/Gospel Albums, No. 1 on the iTunes Christian music digital album sales, No. 1 on the Nielsen Christian SoundScan chart, and has moved to No. 60 on the Billboard US Top 200.

Track listing

A music video has been made for the album's song "Point of Difference" which was officially released and first shown at Jam United in July 2007.

Awards

In 2008, the album was nominated for a Dove Award for Praise & Worship Album of the Year at the 39th GMA Dove Awards.

Featured Musicians
Guitars (Electric) -- Michael Guy Chislett, Timon Klein, Jad Gillies

Guitars (Acoustic) -- Brooke Fraser, Marty Sampson, Joel Houston

Bass—Matthew Tennikoff

Drums—Rolf Wam Fjell, Gabriel Kelly

Keyboards—Peter James

Charts

Year-end charts

Chart procession and succession

Notes
 This album is the first of a three-part project announced on Joel Houston's MySpace "... we've spent the last week recording the first installment in what I'm considering a trilogy of very different projects we have in store..." The others are theiheartrevolution  and In a Valley by the Sea, an under-21s live EP project played by Hillsong United members who are under 21 years old.
 "Break Free", "Hosanna" and "Saviour King" are also on the annual live praise-and-worship album, Saviour King.

References

External links
Official e-card with all new music and videos
UnitedAllofTheAbove.com

Hillsong United albums
2007 debut albums

pt:All of the Above